Fast Companions is a 1932 American pre-Code sports drama film directed by Kurt Neumann and starring Tom Brown, Maureen O'Sullivan and James Gleason.

Cast
 Tom Brown as Marty Black  
 Maureen O'Sullivan as Sally  
 James Gleason as Silk Henley  
 Andy Devine as Information Kid  
 Mickey Rooney as Midge  
 Morgan Wallace as Cueball Kelly  
 Berton Churchill as committee chairman  
 Edgar Kennedy as cop
 Russell Hopton as unidentified character
 Arletta Duncan as unidentified character

References

Bibliography
 Quinlan, David. The Film Lover's Companion: An A to Z Guide to 2,000 Stars and the Movies They Made. Carol Publishing Group, 1997.

External links
 

1932 films
1930s sports films
American horse racing films
Films directed by Kurt Neumann
Universal Pictures films
American black-and-white films
1930s English-language films
1930s American films
English-language sports films